Irvine Harwood (born 1905) was an English professional footballer who played as a centre forward.

Career
Born in Bradford, Harwood played for Bradford Park Avenue, Bradford City and Wolverhampton Wanderers.

For Bradford City he made 5 appearances in the Football League.

Sources

References

1905 births
Year of death missing
English footballers
Bradford (Park Avenue) A.F.C. players
Bradford City A.F.C. players
Wolverhampton Wanderers F.C. players
English Football League players
Association football forwards